Robin's Nest is a British sitcom made by Thames Television, which aired on the ITV network for six series from 11 January 1977 to 31 March 1981. It saw Richard O'Sullivan reprise the role of Robin Tripp, one of the lead characters in the sitcom Man About the House, which had ended on 7 April 1976, and co-starred Tessa Wyatt as Robin's girlfriend – and later wife – Vicky and Tony Britton as her father.  As well as playing a couple in Robin's Nest, O'Sullivan and Wyatt were a couple in real life at the time having one son, Jamie O'Sullivan.

Format
In the first episode, Robin and Vicky, who share a flat over a Chinese take-away, discover that the tenants have disappeared owing rent to the landlord, Vicky's father James Nicholls. It is the practical Vicky who comes up with the perfect solution: Robin should take over the take-away and convert it into a bistro (The "Robin's Nest" of the title). Robin cannot afford to go it alone, so he has to go cap-in-hand to Vicky's father (Tony Britton), to ask him to be his business partner. Although James disapproves of Robin (believing him to be beneath his daughter), he knows a sensible business deal when it is offered to him – despite his failings, Robin is a brilliant chef – and he agrees. Tension and misunderstandings arise due to their mismatched relationship.

Creators and writers Brian Cooke and Johnnie Mortimer had to gain special permission from the Independent Broadcasting Authority (IBA), then the regulatory body for commercial television in Britain, to be able to portray an unmarried couple living together; special concern arose at scenes in which Robin and Vicky were seen in an obvious state of undress in bed. In 1978, Robin and Vicky married and two years later had a set of twins, whom they eventually name Lucy and James Alexander Tripp. At the end of the last episode, Vicky tells Robin that she's pregnant again.

Other characters
Other characters included:

 The one-armed Irish kitchen hand Albert Riddle (David Kelly), who always broke more crockery than he cleaned, and who once asked Robin's culinary advice; unable to cook egg on toast, he asked Robin "How do you stop the egg dribbling into the bottom of the toaster, Mr Tripp?".
 Vicky's mother Marion (divorced from her father) would occasionally appear, played first by Honor Blackman, later by Barbara Murray.
 Gertrude, Albert's girlfriend, played by ex-Crossroads actress Peggy Aitchison.

Robin's Nest screenwriter George Layton appeared as Vernon Potter, a former student who was at college with Robin Tripp, in a few episodes.

Production props
The Daimler Double Six car used in the series by Vicky's father James Nicholls is still in existence (as at Jan 2021) according to DVLA records.

Theme music score
Star of the show Richard O'Sullivan wrote the theme music for the programme, which was arranged and performed by The Shadows' Brian Bennett.

Foreign adaptations
The show was remade in the United States as Three's a Crowd, a sequel to Three's Company – originally based on Man About the House – but was unsuccessful.

In 2004, a Polish version was screened, named Dziupla Cezara.

Episodes

Season 1

Season 2

Season 3

Season 4

Christmas Special (1979)

Season 5

Christmas Special (1980)

Season 6

Home releases
All six series of Robin's Nest have been released on DVD in the UK (Region 2).

All six series have also been released on DVD in Australia (Region 4). Series One and Two appeared in 2 April 2009; after a lengthy delay, Series Three was released on 3 October 2012, followed by Series Four on 6 March 2013, and Series Five and Six on 4 September 2013. For the first time in Australia, The Complete Series Boxset was released on 16 September 2020.

In 2019, a 19-disc box set was released by Network/Fremantle, containing every episode of Man About The House, Robin's Nest and George & Mildred.

References

External links
 Robin's Nest at BBC Online
 
 

1977 British television series debuts
1981 British television series endings
1970s British sitcoms
1980s British sitcoms
British television spin-offs
English-language television shows
Fictional restaurants
ITV sitcoms
Man About the House
Television shows produced by Thames Television
Television series by Fremantle (company)
Television series set in restaurants
Television shows set in London
Television shows shot at Teddington Studios